Diego Claudino da Silva (born 26 March 1993), known as Diego Silva or simply Diego, is a Brazilian footballer who plays as a central defender.

Club career
Born in Recife, Pernambuco, Diego Silva was a Náutico youth graduate. In January 2013 he was promoted to the main squad, and made his senior debut late in the month by starting in a 2–2 Campeonato Pernambucano away draw against Chã Grande/Decisão.

On 16 October 2013 Diego Silva made his Série A debut, coming on as a late substitute for Derley in a 0–3 away loss against São Paulo. He finished the campaign with six appearances, as his side suffered relegation as dead last; he also extended his contract until 2015 shortly after his top level debut.

After being rarely used in 2014, Diego Silva was a regular starter in 2015. He scored his first professional goal on 16 May 2015, scoring a last-minute winner in a victory at Boa Esporte.

In July 2015, Diego Silva suffered a knee injury, being sidelined for two months. He subsequently lost his starting spot after his return, and was released.

On 13 January 2015 Diego Silva joined Santos, being initially assigned to the B-team. Sixteen days later he was promoted to the main squad, due to limited options in his position.

On 10 July 2017, after only making appearances for the B-team, Diego Silva moved abroad after joining C.D. Nacional on a one-year deal.

Career statistics

References

External links

1993 births
Sportspeople from Recife
Living people
Brazilian footballers
Association football defenders
Clube Náutico Capibaribe players
Santos FC players
C.D. Nacional players
Salgueiro Atlético Clube players
Retrô Futebol Clube Brasil players
Campeonato Brasileiro Série A players
Campeonato Brasileiro Série B players
Campeonato Brasileiro Série C players
Campeonato Brasileiro Série D players
Campeonato Pernambucano players
Liga Portugal 2 players
Brazilian expatriate footballers
Brazilian expatriate sportspeople in Portugal
Expatriate footballers in Portugal